"Lonely Lullaby" is a song by American electronica project Owl City from his third studio album All Things Bright and Beautiful (2011). Originally released as a fan club exclusive in March 2011, the song is not included on the album itself. It was released digitally on July 19, 2011 through Universal Republic Records as the third single from All Things Bright and Beautiful.

Composition
"Lonely Lullaby" is an emo-influenced ballad written and produced by Adam Young of Owl City. According to the digital sheet music published by Universal Music Publishing Group, the song was originally composed in the key of F major and set in common time to a "flowing" tempo of approximately 69 BPM. "Lonely Lullaby" follows a chord progression of C – Gm – F – C – B – F and Young's vocals span from a low note of C to a high note of B. The song is a tribute to Annmarie Monson, an ex-girlfriend of Young's, who he describes as the "most wonderful, beautiful woman" he knew. He stated that the track was a lot more "personal" to him.

Track listing

Charts

References

2010s singles
2011 singles
2011 songs
Owl City songs
Universal Republic Records singles
Pop ballads
Songs written by Adam Young